Acraea ranavalona is a butterfly in the family Nymphalidae. It is found on Madagascar and the Comoros.

Description

A. ranavalona Bdv. (53 c, d). Forewing at the base as far as vein 2 bright red (male) or almost completely hyaline (female); hindwing with grey, often semitransparent, red-spotted marginal band, the red marginal spots proximally bounded by sharply defined black submarginal dots; basal and discal dots distinct; ground-colour beneath white, above in the male bright red, in the female white or whitish. Madagascar and Comoros. - female ab. manandaza Ward (53 d). Ground-colour of the hindwing more or less reddish. Madagascar -  ab. maransetra Ward. The discal dots of the hindwing united into a transverse band. Madagascar.

Biology
The habitat consists of forests. The colours in life  may be much brighter than those shown in early collections and in museums.

Taxonomy
It is a member of the Acraea terpsicore species group -  but see also Pierre & Bernaud, 2014 

Acraea (group ranavalona) ranavalona; Henning, 1993, Metamorphosis 4 (1): 11
Acraea (Acraea) (group neobule) ranavalona; Pierre & Bernaud, 2013, Butterflies of the World 39: 5, pl. 15, f. 8-10

References

External links

Images representing  Acraea ranavalona at Bold
Images of Acraea ranavalona at Le Site des Acraea de Dominique Bernaud

Butterflies described in 1833
ranavalona